Siphai Maqbool Hussain co-produced by Brig Syed Mujtaba Tirmizi from ISPR and Interflow Communications Limited is a Pakistani miniseries, aired during the month of April 2008, simultaneously on TV One and PTV, that narrates the true story of a Pakistani soldier, Maqbool Hussain, who was injured and taken prisoner by the Indian Army in the 1965 war and spent 40 years in Indian jails. He was released as a civilian prisoner in 2005. During his imprisonment, Hussain was said to be subjected to terrible human rights abuses. The drama pays tribute to Sepoy Maqbool Hussain as an icon of resilience and steadfastness. It is directed by Brigadier Syed Mujtaba Tirmizi and Haider Imam Rizvi.

Plot
As the story unfolds, Maqbool Hussain, bearing army No 335139, is shown being hit by enemy fire on the Line of Control at the start of the 1965 war. Subsequently, he is taken prisoner by the Indian army, who deny him Prisoner of War status. Trained in the traditions of the Pakistan Army, Maqbool Hussain faces great suffering and refuses to share any information about his country with his captors — so much so that when they cut out his tongue, he writes Pakistan Zindabad (long live Pakistan) in his own blood. Maqbool Hussain also beaten into becoming mentally ill during his four decades of incarceration.

Director's comments
Director Haider Imam Rizvi, who has dozens of popular television and movies and plays and serials to his credit, told the gathering he and his team had been reduced to tears several times during the filming of the poignant scenes in the drama serial. "In my opinion, the production of 'Sipahi Maqbool Hussain' is more significant than all the 40 serials that I have produced in my entire career," Rizvi said.

See also 
 ISPR Media Productions

References

External links
COAS Kayani paying tribute to Maqbool Hussain
Fair & Square: To Sepoy Maqbool Hussain with loveb y Mian Saifur Rehman
The story of Sipahi Maqbool Hussain – Indo-Pak War 1965
Watch Complete Drama Sipahi Maqbool Hussain (2008)

Urdu-language television shows
Pakistan Television Corporation original programming
Military of Pakistan in fiction
2000s Pakistani television series
2008 Pakistani television series debuts
Indian Armed Forces in fiction
Television shows set in India
Kashmir conflict in fiction
Inter-Services Public Relations media productions
Inter-Services Public Relations dramas
Inter-Services Public Relations films